The Thailand women's national under-20 volleyball team represents the Thailand for the under-20 and 19 level in international volleyball competitions. It is managed by the Thailand Volleyball Association.

Results

U20 World Championship 

 Champions   Runners up   Third place   Fourth place

U19 Asian Championship
 Champions   Runners up   Third place   Fourth place

Players

Current squad
The following 12 players were called up for the 2021 FIVB Volleyball Women's U20 World Championship in Belgium, Netherlands.

Player statistics

Notes:
 OH Outside Hitter
 OPP Opposite Spiker
 S Setter
 MB Middle Blocker
 L Libero
 NAT National team
 U23 Under-23 team

Results and fixtures

See also
 Thailand women's national volleyball team
 Thailand women's national under-23 volleyball team
 Thailand women's national under-18 volleyball team

References

External links
Official website
FIVB profile

U
National women's under-20 volleyball teams 
Women's volleyball in Thailand